Hannu Kalevi Manninen (born 17 April 1978 in Rovaniemi) is a Finnish nordic combined athlete. Debuting at the 1994 Winter Olympics in Lillehammer at the age of 15, he took his first medal three years later at the age of 18 when he won silver in the 4 × 5 km team event at the FIS Nordic World Ski Championships. At the 2002 Winter Olympics, he won a gold medal in the 4 × 5 km team event at the age of 23. He has five other Nordic skiing World Championships medals, earning three golds (4 × 5 km team: 1999, 2007 and  7.5 km sprint: 2007) and two bronzes (4 × 5 km team: 2001, 2003). He has two other Olympic team medals as well (silver: 1998, bronze: 2006).

Manninen formerly had the record for most wins (48) and most championship titles (4), after passing Kenji Ogiwara's records during the 2006–07 season, in the FIS Nordic Combined World Cup. He also has won the 7.5 km sprint event of the Nordic combined three times (2002, 2004, 2005) at the Holmenkollen ski festival.

As a cross country skier, he finished 8th in the individual sprint event at the 2002 Winter Olympics.

Manninen announced his first retirement from competition on 29 May 2008 to focus on his family and a future career as an airline pilot. He made his comeback to World Cup on 28 November 2009 in Ruka (Kuusamo), Finland, where he finished 2nd. Day after he won his first race after comeback. The first race in 2010 took place in Oberhof Germany where Manninen won for the 47th time in his sporting career. He made his second comeback on 7 January 2017 in Lahti, Finland, where he finished 18th.

Personal life 
His younger sister, Pirjo is a cross-country skier who has also won several World Championship medals, including three golds at the FIS Nordic World Ski Championships (Individual sprint: 2001, 4 × 5 km: 2007, 2009). They are the first brother-sister combination to ever win gold medals at the same championships.

Manninen graduated from the Finnish Aviation Academy in 2011 and is working for Finnair as of 2016.

Cross-country skiing results
All results are sourced from the International Ski Federation (FIS).

Olympic Games

World Cup

Season standings

See also
List of Olympic medalist families

Sources 
 ESPN.com May 29, 2008 announcement of Manninen's retirement. – accessed May 29, 2008.
 FIS Newsflash 177 on Manninen's potential retirement. April 30, 2008.
 . Cross-country
 . Nordic combined
 Holmenkollen winners since 1892 – click Vinnere for downloadable pdf file

References

Hannu Manninen Profile. International Ski Federation. March 27th 2018. 

1978 births
Living people
People from Rovaniemi
Cross-country skiers at the 2002 Winter Olympics
Finnish aviators
Finnish male Nordic combined skiers
Finnish male cross-country skiers
Holmenkollen Ski Festival winners
Nordic combined skiers at the 1994 Winter Olympics
Nordic combined skiers at the 1998 Winter Olympics
Nordic combined skiers at the 2002 Winter Olympics
Nordic combined skiers at the 2006 Winter Olympics
Nordic combined skiers at the 2010 Winter Olympics
Nordic combined skiers at the 2018 Winter Olympics
Olympic cross-country skiers of Finland
Olympic Nordic combined skiers of Finland
Olympic gold medalists for Finland
Olympic silver medalists for Finland
Olympic bronze medalists for Finland
Olympic medalists in Nordic combined
FIS Nordic World Ski Championships medalists in Nordic combined
Medalists at the 2006 Winter Olympics
Medalists at the 2002 Winter Olympics
Medalists at the 1998 Winter Olympics
Commercial aviators
Holmenkollen medalists
Sportspeople from Lapland (Finland)
21st-century Finnish people